Ethminolia probabilis is a species of sea snail, a marine gastropod mollusk in the family Trochidae, the top snails.

Description
The size of the shell attains 8 mm.

Distribution
This marine species occurs off the Philippines and Australia (New South Wales)

References

Further reading
 Adams, A. 1853. Contributions towards a monograph of the Trochidae, a family of gastropodous Mollusca. Proceedings of the Zoological Society of London 1851(19): 150–192
 Fischer, P. 1879. Genres Calcar, Trochus, Xenophora, Tectarius et Risella. 337–463, 120 pls in Keiner, L.C. (ed.). Spécies general et iconographie des coquilles vivantes. Paris : J.B. Baillière Vol. 3.
 Iredale, T. 1924. Results from Roy Bell's molluscan collections. Proceedings of the Linnean Society of New South Wales 49(3): 179–279, pl. 33-36
 Iredale, T. 1929. Mollusca from the continental shelf of eastern Australia. No. 2. Records of the Australian Museum 17(4): 157–189, pls 38–41 
 Kershaw, R.C. 1955. A systematic list of the Mollusca of Tasmania, Australia. Papers and Proceedings of the Royal Society of Tasmania 89: 289–355
 Iredale, T. & McMichael, D.F. 1962. A reference list of the marine Mollusca of New South Wales. Memoirs of the Australian Museum 11: 1–109 
 Gabriel, C.J. 1962. Additions to the marine molluscan fauna of south eastern Australia including descriptions of new genus Pillarginella, six new marine species and two subspecies. Memoirs of the National Museum of Victoria, Melbourne 25: 177–210, 1 pl.
 Wilson, B. 1993. Australian Marine Shells. Prosobranch Gastropods. Kallaroo, Western Australia : Odyssey Publishing Vol. 1 408 pp.

probabilis
Gastropods described in 1924